A referendum on European Union membership was held in Austria on 12 June 1994. The question asked was "Shall the National Council's decision of 5 May 1994 on the Constitutional Law (Bundesverfassungsgesetz) concerning the Accession of Austria to the European Union be enacted as law?" The result of the vote was 67% in favour, with a turnout of 82%. Austria subsequently joined the EU as part of the 1995 enlargement.

Party positions

Results

By state

References

Referendums in Austria
Austria
Referendums related to European Union accession
Austria and the European Union
1994 in Austria
Austria